Ramón Enrique Acevedo Kerkadó (born December 21, 1971 in Bayamon, Puerto Rico) is a Puerto Rican pop music singer, actor, and visual artist who was a member of the Puerto Rican boy band Menudo. He now lives in New York.

He was a soloist when in 1985, Acevedo joined Menudo after his second audition when he was 13 years old. (Ricky Martin is three days younger than Raymond Acevedo.) In a concert in Japan, when they believed they didn't need a security deal, they were surprised when they were overcome by fans.

Acevedo sang such hits as "En San Juan me Enamore", “Pañuelo Blanco Americano", and "It's You and Me All The Way", which became an international hit. Along with his fellow Menudo members, Acevedo starred in the Argentina soap opera Por Siempre Amigos. The soap opera aired in 1987, and ran for 100 episodes. Acevedo left Menudo on August 2, 1988 and soon after moved to the United  States.

Living in New York, Acevedo worked on Off-Broadway productions in New York City and wrote songs with cross-culture appeal.

In 1999,  Acevedo and Aurelio Laing III collaborated on lyrics and music, ultimately creating Afterworld Records. During the winter of 2000, they recorded their first album, "Amor Oculto" ("Hidden Love"), in San Antonio, Texas, releasing it in 2001. In 2005, the two collaborated again on an alternative English release of his Age of Anxiety album.

In 2007, Acevedo performed a series of shows in Brazil and Latin America with a group called .

In recent years, Acevedo released two guitar-driven pop songs “Addictive Love” and “La Vi En Paris” were recently released, along with music videos.  He was also to appear in the play “Noches De Vellonera”, a musical/comedy performance, in Central Florida.

Acevedo also creates charcoal drawings and oil paintings, having attended a visual arts school in New York.

In 2018, Acevedo spent time on a TV and radio tour promoting his song  in Puerto Rico.

Discography

With Menudo 
 Menudo (1985)
 Ayer y Hoy (1985)
 Viva! Bravo! (1986)
 Refrescante (1986)
 Can't Get Enough (1986)
 Menudo (Portuguese) (1986)
 Somos Los Hijos del Rock (1987)
 In Action (1987)
 Sons of Rock (1987)

References

External links
 
 
 
 Ray Acevedeo 2017 interview on YouTube
 Ray Acevedeo 2016 interview on YouTube

1971 births
Living people
People from Bayamón, Puerto Rico
Menudo (band) members
20th-century Puerto Rican male singers
Puerto Rican rock singers
21st-century American male singers
21st-century American singers